The National Theatre of the Deaf (NTD) is a Connecticut-based theatre company founded in 1967, and is the oldest theatre company in the United States with a continuous history of domestic and international touring, as well as producing original works. NTD productions combine American Sign Language with spoken language to fulfill the theatre's mission statement of linking Deaf and hearing communities, providing more exposure to sign language, and educating the public about Deaf art. The NTD is affiliated with a drama school, also founded in 1967, and with the Little Theatre of the Deaf (LTD), established in 1968 to produce shows for a younger audience.

Prior to the National Theatre of the Deaf, there were no theatre college-level programs created to support deaf aspiring actors. Furthermore, there were three major deaf theatre groups, these being "The New York Association of the Deaf," "The New York Theatre Guild of the Deaf" and "The Metropolitan Theatre guild of the Deaf."

The first official performance of the NTD was a production of The Man With His Heart in the Highlands at Wesleyan University in 1967. NTD members participated in the first National and Worldwide Deaf Theatre Conference in 1994. Many deaf actors have earned acclaim through their work with the NTD in performances, conferences, and community outreach. The NTD has been fundamental in the creation of an international Deaf theatre community, and has received several awards, including the Tony Award for Theatrical Excellence. The company has visited each of the 50 states during over 150 national tours, as well as over 30 countries.

Founding 
The belief and vision of the National Theatre of the Deaf was brought into the world by Edna S. Levine, a psychologist who had a passion for helping the deaf,  and Anne Bancroft, a deaf actress. They were able to combine their passion for theatre and desire to promote deaf art into being the spark plugs for NTD. 

In 1946, Robert Panara, a graduate of Gallaudet University and newly hired teacher at the New York School for the Deaf, produced a play with Bernard Bragg, a 17-year-old student in Panara's English class. Later in the 1940s, when Bragg was a student at Gallaudet, Panara left New York School for the Deaf to teach at Gallaudet. While both at Gallaudet, Panara and Bragg conceived of the idea of a theater for the Deaf.

In 1963, Dr. Edna Levine, a professor of Deaf studies at New York University, saw Bragg perform a one-man show in New York City. She asked him for a meeting and shared her own vision for a national theater for the deaf. In 1965, they obtained a federal grant from the U.S. Department of Health, Education, and Welfare to establish the NTD. Additional grant money was given by the Office of Education. Mary E. Switzer of the Department of Health, Education, and Welfare and Boyce R. Williams and Malcolm Norwood of the Rehabilitation Services Administration were important advocates of funding the NTD.

Levine and Bragg worked with set designer David Hays, a well-respected Harvard graduate who had ample experience in theatrical design and was even a well-known broadway designer, to establish a mission statement, locate funding, select a location, and assemble a company. The founders also included Anne Bancroft, who played Annie Sullivan in the Broadway production of The Miracle Worker, and Arthur Penn and Gene Lasko, directors of The Miracle Worker. Bancroft and Hays were drawn to work with one another because both “ were captivated by the idea that sign language had a place on the world’s stage as a performing art form.”

Mission and location

The founders' mission was to feature sign language in the theater for both deaf and hearing audiences. The founders believed that audience members need to “hear every word and see every word” in all NTD productions. To fulfill this mission, productions included both Deaf and hearing actors. The language used by the Deaf performers included sign language, mime, and gesture, and the hearing actors provided spoken language. Bragg had studied under the French mime Marcel Marceau, and his acting style influenced the early NTD productions.

Originally, the NTD was located on the campus of the Eugene O'Neill Theatre Center in Waterford, Connecticut. In 1983, the NTD moved to Chester, Connecticut. In 2000, the NTD moved to Hartford, Connecticut, and in 2004 moved onto the campus of the American School for the Deaf in West Hartford. Since 2012, the NTD has again been based at the O'Neill Theatre Center while maintaining a satellite office on the campus of the American School for the Deaf.

Furthermore, the NTD focuses on fighting perceptions of those who are Deaf. The NTD fights to be a catalyst for social change.  Its mission is to tell authentic stories while furthering the representation and roles of Deaf actors and performers. There is a celebration of all cultures and groups. NTD had a mission to help underserved populations, wanting to assist people by engaging, educating, and entertaining their audience.

As stated in NTD’s “National Theatre of the Deaf Public Testimony before Appropriations Committee”  written by Betty Beekman the Executive Director in March of 2015, the missions statement of NTD is:

“To present theatrical work of the highest quality, performing in the unique style we created through blending American Sign Language and spoken word.

In support of this mission, NTD:  

-entertains, educates, and enlightens the general public, building bridges, opening their eyes and ears to Deaf culture;  

-seeks, trains, and employs deaf, hard of hearing, and hearing artists;  

-offers its work to culturally diverse and inclusive audiences through performances, workshops, training, and community outreach activities which facilitate involvement with our methods of work.”

Actors, instructors, and curriculum
The founding company included:

 Violet Armstrong
 Bernard Bragg
 Charles Corey
 Gilbert Eastman
 Lou Fant
 Ed Fearon
 Joyce Flynn Lasko
 Phyllis Frelich
 Dorothy Miles
 Mary Beth Miller
 Audree Norton
 Howard Palmer
 Will Rhys
 June Russi
 Tim Scanlon 
 Morton Steinberg
 Andrew Vasnick
 Joe Velez
 Ralph White

Early instructors in the school included:

 Bernard Bragg
 Eric Malzkuhn
 Bob Panara
 Sahome Tachibana
 Gina Blau
 William Rhys
 George C. White III

The school's curriculum included:

 Acting
 Mime
 Bodily movement
 Stagecraft
 Lighting
 Costuming
 History of theater
 Creative dance
 Japanese dance
 Hindu movement
 Tumbling
 Fencing

Notable actors

Phyllis Frelich received the Tony Award for Best Actress in a Play in 1980 for Children of a Lesser God, produced by the Mark Taper Forum in Los Angeles.

Linda Bove appeared regularly on the television series Sesame Street.

Most recently, NTD alumni Troy Kotsur, who had performed with NTD from the years of 1991 to 1993, in both the shows Ophelia and Treasure Island, received the Oscar for Best Supporting Actor in the film Coda. In fact, in his acceptance speech, he thanked “ “all of the Deaf theaters that have given me the opportunity to grow as an actor.” 

Other actors who have worked with NTD include Colleen Dewhurst, Sir Michael Redgrave, Chita Rivera, Jason Robards, and Meryl Streep. NTD actress Jane Norman went on to become a prominent voice in deaf media studies at Gallaudet University. While some NTD actors have achieved recognition in theatre, a greater number of Deaf actors, including Chuck Baird, Eric Malzkuhn, Ed Waterstreet, Gilbert Eastman, Mary Beth Miller, Freda Norman, and Manny Hernandez, have achieved recognition primarily within Deaf theatre.

Productions, touring, and reception

Rehearsals and performances occupied most of each day for both company actors and students. The company toured by bus domestically and internationally. They received only part-time pay, and paid out-of-pocket for their travel. Both the company and the students lived dormitory-style at the O'Neill Theater Center while rehearsing, and slept either on the bus or in inexpensive hotels while touring domestically. While touring internationally, the actors stayed in hostels.

The company performed plays written by hearing and Deaf playwrights. Hearing audiences have generally had positive responses to NTD productions, while Deaf and Hard of Hearing audiences have often had mixed reviews. Deaf and Hard of Hearing audience members sometimes expected productions to be more focused around the Deaf experience, and to be less dramatized. Some Deaf audience members have seen NTD productions as catering to hearing audiences, which has generated a negative response. However, many Deaf audience members have responded positively and appreciated NTD productions.

The NTD has been discussed in newspapers such as Silent News, journals such as the Puppetry Journal, and television shows such as Deaf Mosaic, which aired during the 1980s and 1990s. Many scholars have written about the NTD in books and dissertations.

Furthermore, NTD has recently appeared on both Disney Plus, Sesame Street, and The White House.

References

Powers, Helen. "The National Theatre of the Deaf." (2021)

Hays, David. "The National Theatre of the Deaf." Deaf, The National Theatre of the. New York: The National Theatre of the Deaf (1969)

Wells, Cortney. "A Decade of Deaf Theatre: An analysis of theatre within the Deaf Community, the expansion of its acceptance, and the influence it has today." (2016).

Cosh, Jackie. "Model lessons in a theatre for the deaf." The Times Educational Supplement Scotland 2274 (2012): 20.

NTD.org

1967 establishments in Connecticut
American companies established in 1967
Theatre companies in Connecticut
Deaf culture in the United States
Deafness arts organizations
Disability theatre
Special Tony Award recipients